Rowan Harrington (born 28 January 1987), better known by his stage name Secondcity, is an American-born British DJ and record producer, best known for his song "I Wanna Feel", which peaked at number one on the UK Singles Chart.

Musical career

2014–present: Breakthrough
In May 2014, he released his debut single "I Wanna Feel", the song was at number one on the official midweek BBC Radio 1 singles charts after being released on 25 May 2014 and has over 47,000,000 views on YouTube. On 1 June 2014 the song entered the UK Singles Chart and the UK Dance Chart at number 1. He has since been championed by Disclosure and collaborated with Route 94 for the third time. The follow-up single to "I Wanna Feel", titled "What Can I Do", premiered on 26 July 2014 and featured vocals from Ali Love.

In October 2020, he teamed up with Paul Woolford (at the time in the UK top ten with Diplo and Kareen Lomax on a track called "Looking for Me") and Andrea Martin for a track released by Black Butter Records called "All I Want".

Discography

Singles

As lead artist

References

1987 births
Living people
American emigrants to England
English house musicians
English DJs
English record producers
People from Wealden District
Electronic dance music DJs